Kheyrabad (also Romanized as Kheyrābād) is a village in Zarem Rud Rural District, Hezarjarib District, Neka County, Mazandaran Province, Iran. At the 2006 census, its population was 191, in 42 families.

References 

Populated places in Neka County